Beme Inc., stylized as beme, was a multimedia company founded by Matt Hackett and Casey Neistat, a vlogger and short film maker on YouTube. Beme Inc. was the creator of the mobile app Beme. On November 28, 2016, CNN announced that it would acquire Beme. CNN intended to invest in the company and create a new brand focused on a young audience. The Beme app was officially shut down on January 31, 2017. Beme was merged into CNN Digital Studios on January 25, 2018. Beme continued to publish documentaries and news reports to its YouTube channel. Its last video was published on August 8, 2019.

History
In 2014, Beme Inc. was founded by Matt Hackett and Casey Neistat. On July 17, 2015, Beme Inc. released a mobile app called Beme on the iOS App Store. The app enables users to produce unedited 2-to-8-second videos, which are immediately uploaded and shared with the user's subscribers, without the ability to preview the video. On May 2, 2016, Beme was released for Android on the Google Play Store. At TechCrunch, in May 2016, Neistat informed that they had raised a total of US$6M and had 11 full-time employees (10 technical, 1 responsible for social media). He also reported that burn rate was around US $180k per month and that his salary was US$0.

On November 28, 2016, CNN announced the acquisition of Beme Inc. for a reported US$25 million and became a subsidiary of Turner Broadcasting System, Inc. In late 2017, cofounders Matt Hackett and Casey Neistat announced that they were leaving Beme and that it would be folded into CNN Digital Studios. A YouTube page titled Beme News made content until August 2019.

Acquisition by CNN
On November 28, 2016, CNN announced the acquisition of Beme Inc. for a reported US$25 million. On November 29, 2016, Matt Hackett, co-founder of Beme Inc., announced via an email to its users that the Beme app would be shutting down on January 31, 2017. Since the shutdown of the app, it was announced that CNN intended to use the current talent behind the Beme app to work on a separate start-up endeavor. Beme's current team will retain full creative control of the new project which is scheduled to release in the summer of 2017. Beme has brought on the host of Vsauce 3, Jake Roper, as Head of Production.

On January 25, 2018, Casey Neistat announced on his YouTube channel that he and Beme co-founder Matt Hackett were leaving Beme Inc. and that Beme would be brought into CNN Digital Studios. Neistat will still be credited as an Executive Producer for the show.

References

CNN
Internet properties established in 2015
2015 establishments in New York City
2017 mergers and acquisitions
Companies based in Manhattan
Online mass media companies of the United States